Gabriela Acher (born 5 August 1944 in Montevideo) is a Uruguayan actress and comedian, active in Argentina.

Biography
Acher was born in Montevideo to a Sephardic family originary from Turkey. She started her career alongside the comedians Ricardo Espalter, Enrique Almada and Eduardo D'Angelo, appearing on television programs such as Telecataplúm and Hupumorpo. Soon she developed her own characters, notably "Chochy la dicharachera", which typically used "ch" in every possible word or phrase.

Television 
1963: Telecataplúm (humour): various characters.
La tuerca (humour): various characters.
1969: Muchacha italiana viene a casarse (telenovela): Amalia.
1969: Jaujarana (humour): various characters.
1974-1975-1976-1977: Hupumorpo (humour): various characters.
1976: Mi cuñado (humour): various characters.
1980: Dos y Bartolo (humour).
1979-1980-1981: Comicolor (humour): various characters: «Chochi, la dicharachera», vedette «Lorena del Valle», imitations of Raffaella Carrá, Liza Minnelli, Donna Summer, Mina, etc.
1986: Los Retratos de Andrés.
1989-1990 Tato Diet (humour, with Tato Bores).
1991: Hagamos el humor (humour) Martín Fierro Award 1992.
1991: Juana y sus hermanas (humour, with Juana Molina): various characters.
1998: Gasoleros (telenovela).

Filmography 
1973: Los caballeros de la cama redonda (with Alberto Olmedo y Jorge Porcel).
1973: Los Doctores las prefieren desnudas (with Alberto Olmedo y Jorge Porcel).
1982: Señora de nadie (Isabel), known as Nobody’s Wife in USA.
1986: Soy paciente (unfinished).
1989: Eversmile, New Jersey directed by Carlos Sorín 
1996: Autumn Sun: Silvia. 
1998: Cohen vs. Rosi: Miriam Cohen.
2000: Waiting for the Messiah: Sara. 
2011: My First Wedding ...Raquel

References

External links

AlternativaTeatral.com (biografía y fotografía de Acher).
Clarín (entrevista de María Laura Santillán, en el diario Clarín, junto con las actrices Mirta Busnelli y Carmen Barbieri; foto de las cuatro juntas).
LaNacion.com.ar (entrevista y bio en el diario La Nación del 11 de mayo de 2007).
Entrevista a Gabriela Acher en MundoEva (Entrevista del 6 de abril de 2010).

1944 births
Actresses from Montevideo
Jewish actresses
Uruguayan women comedians
20th-century Uruguayan actresses
Uruguayan expatriate actresses in Argentina
Uruguayan Jews
Uruguayan people of Turkish-Jewish descent
Living people
21st-century Uruguayan actresses
Uruguayan television actresses